The Karachi Boat Club (KBC) is a recreational boat club in Karachi, Sindh, Pakistan.

History
It was founded in 1881 in British India.

The club is a prominent venue for regattas, boating and rowing competitions as well as tournaments.

See also
 Karachi Yacht Club

References

External links
 

Boating associations
Rowing clubs in Pakistan
Rowing venues
Sports venues in Karachi
Organisations based in Karachi
1881 establishments in British India